Education in Papua New Guinea is managed through nineteen provinces and two district organisational units. It is tuition-free and attendance is not compulsory. 

The Human Rights Measurement Initiative (HRMI) finds that Papua New Guinea is fulfilling only 50.8% of what it should be fulfilling for the right to education based on the country's level of income. HRMI breaks down the right to education by looking at the rights to both primary education and secondary education. While taking into consideration Papua New Guinea's income level, the nation is achieving 64.1% of what should be possible based on its resources (income) for primary education and only 37.5% for secondary education.

History
The first school in Papua New Guinea was established in 1873 by English missionaries. Missionaries would continue providing the basis for education, with English and German as primary languages. In 1914, as part of World War I, Australia took control over German New Guinea and English became the sole official language.
 
The Currie Commission was created in 1964 to investigate the establishment of higher education in the Territory of Papua and New Guinea. In 1965 the first university in Papua New Guinea, the University of Papua New Guinea, was established. It was heavily influenced by the Australian education system.

Education in Papua New Guinea has been tuition-free since 2012, as one of the election promises of the People's National Congress.

Provision
Papua New Guinea's history of missionary education has led to a large part of education being provided by religious schools. The Department of Education has estimated that 29% of the country's lower secondary education is operated by churches. 3% is operated by private international schools, while the remainder is funded by the government.

Educational Stages
Papua New Guinea has an A-to-D grading system, with D being a failing grade.

Universities

There are six universities in Papua New Guinea. These are accredited under the PNG Office of Higher Education and have establishing Acts of Parliament. The six universities and the main campus of each are, in alphabetical order:
Divine Word University in Madang
Pacific Adventist University in Port Moresby
University of Goroka in Goroka
University of Natural Resources and Environment in Vudal with associated campuses in Popondetta, Kavieng and Sepik
University of Papua New Guinea in Port Moresby
University of Technology (Unitech) in Lae

Language education
In 2015, Papua New Guinean Sign Language became an official language in PNG. Based on Auslan, it is used in deaf education.

References